"" (Luxembourgish for "The Wilhelmus") is the grand ducal anthem of Luxembourg. Lyrics for it were written in 1919 by Luxembourgish writer Nik Welter, although they are not often used in official performances. The anthem is performed whenever a member of the Grand Ducal Family enters or leaves an official ceremony, while the national anthem, "Ons Heemecht", is performed at national celebrations.

History 
"De Wilhelmus" has a common origin with the Dutch national anthem, "Het Wilhelmus", which dates back to the 16th century, although they do not use the same melody and had not done so since around that time. Luxembourg was in a personal union with the Netherlands from 1815 until 1890, and the tune was played on a few official visits of members of the Dutch royal family to Luxembourg from 1883. "De Wilhelmus" became explicitly associated with the Grand Ducal family in Luxembourg by the end of the 1800s, around the same time "Ons Heemecht" was being popularised.

In 1915, Luxembourgish author Willy Georgen wrote the first lyrics for the anthem, to commemorate the 1815 Congress of Vienna. Although his lyrics were supported by Grand Duchess Marie-Adélaïde, World War I and the 1919 abdication of Marie-Adélaïde in favour of her sister Charlotte after suspicions of pro-German sentiment meant Georgen's lyrics were not officially adopted.

In 1919, Luxembourgish writer Nik Welter wrote lyrics for the anthem for the marriage of Grand Duchess Charlotte and Prince Félix on 6 November that year. The anthem with Welter's words was first performed on 23 January 1920, Charlotte's 24th birthday, at the Te Deum service at Notre-Dame Cathedral by the cathedral choir, as an "anthem for the House of Luxembourg-Nassau-Bourbon". Around the same time, Luxembourg Cathedral organist Jean-Pierre Beicht harmonised the anthem for a four-piece choir. Welter subsequently dropped the first verse he had written for the anthem, which was marked too strongly by the events of the time, leaving it with the version of today.

In 1939, half a year before the German invasion of Luxembourg, a slightly altered version of Willy Georgen's 1915 lyrics were published, but they did not become popular.

Lyrics
Although Nik Welter's lyrics from 1919 remain today, most Luxembourgers do not know them, as typically only the melody is played on official occasions.

Second lyrics

Original lyrics

See also 
 "Ons Heemecht", the national anthem of Luxembourg
 "Het Wilhelmus", the national anthem of the Netherlands

Notes

References

External links
 "Les usages protocolaires de la Cour" [Protocols of the court] incl. sound file and score of "De Wilhelmus" (in French)

Royal anthems
National symbols of Luxembourg
Luxembourgian songs
European anthems